The 1976–77 Vancouver Canucks season was the team's seventh in the NHL. The Canucks failed to reach the playoffs. Phil Maloney, the team's general manager and head coach, was replaced mid-season as head coach by Orland Kurtenbach, the first captain of the Canucks.

Off-season
The Canucks made a complete change in the goal department for the 1976–77 season. On August 23, disgruntled Gary Smith was traded to Minnesota for veteran Cesare Maniago.  Born and raised in Trail, Maniago became the first home-grown British Columbian to be a Canucks regular.  In September, Ken Lockett signed as a free-agent with San Diego of the World Hockey Association.  The back-up job was inherited by Curt Ridley.  Both goalies would see plenty of rubber. The retirement of Andre Boudrias meant that the captaincy was available and Chris Oddleifson filled the vacancy.

Regular season
Sophomore right-winger Rick Blight scored four goals in a 9–5 loss in Pittsburgh on opening night and continued to lead the team in scoring throughout the season, finishing with 68 points.  The loss was a sign of things to come, as the Canucks won only five of their first 24 games.  After a 5–4 home loss to Montreal on December 20, Phil Maloney decided that he needed more time to concentrate on his General Manager duties and called up ex-Canuck captain Orland Kurtenbach from Tulsa of the Central League to coach the remainder of the season. He started off with a 3–2 win in Los Angeles before winning only one of his next eight.

In the middle of that streak was a game that did not count but garnered considerable attention.  The Canucks hosted the Soviet club Spartak Moscow on December 28 at the Pacific Coliseum.  Rick Blight scored twice and Curt Ridley picked up a shutout as the Canucks won 2–0 before a jubilant full house.  On January 25 there was another special event at the Coliseum—the NHL All-Star Game.  Harold Snepsts represented the Canucks in the mid-season classic, which was won 4–3 by the Wales Conference.

But the team stumbled along until March, perhaps partly due to the infrequent play of rugged defenseman Mike Robitaille, who was having back problems.  Then in a February 11 game against Pittsburgh, which the Canucks won 3–2, Robitaille came out of the penalty box and was blind-sided by Penguins tough-guy Dennis Owchar. Robitaille suffered a spinal injury and never played again.  He later sued the Canucks for forcing him to play hurt, misdiagnosing his injuries, and making slanderous comments about him (calling him a "head case" and a hypochondriac) and was awarded $540,000 by the Supreme Court of B.C. in 1978.

With 17 games to play, there seemed to be no hope of salvaging the season, as the Canucks trailed Chicago for the third and final Smythe Division playoff spot by 15 points.  But Vancouver went 8–3–6, which included a 10-game unbeaten streak (5–0–5).  Chicago, meanwhile, took a nose dive and went 3–13–1 to finish up.  The Canucks won both key meetings with the Black Hawks during that stretch.  Unfortunately, they had to come from too far behind and a 6–3 home loss to Colorado in game number 79 eliminated them from playoff contention.  They then won 6–3 over Minnesota in the finale to finish with 63 points, causing them to miss the final playoff spot to the Hawks on a tiebreaker (26–25 in wins).

Besides Blight's fine season, Dennis Kearns upped his franchise record for defensemen to 55 assists and set a new record with
60 points.  But Kearns was also often the victim of the Coliseum boo-birds for his apparent lack of physical play and a tendency to make bad gambles.  In any event, it was apparent that the modest success of the previous couple of seasons had gone for naught and that it was once again back to the drawing board.

Final standings

Schedule and results

Playoffs

Player statistics

Awards and records

Transactions

Draft picks
Vancouver's picks at the 1976 NHL Entry Draft. The draft was at the NHL office in Montreal, Quebec, Canada.

See also
1976–77 NHL season

References

 

Vancouver Canucks season, 1976-77
Vancouver Canucks seasons
Vancouver
National Hockey League All-Star Game hosts